Syed Fakhruddin Ahmad (1889-1972) was an Indian Sunni Muslim scholar and jurist who served as the Principal of Madrasa Shahi, and the sixth President of Jamiat Ulama-e-Hind. He was a professor of hadith at the Darul Uloom Deoband.

Biography
Syed Fakhruddin Ahmad studied Quran with his mother and Persian with family elders. Aged eight, he began studying Arabic grammar and syntax. He enrolled in Madrassa Manba al-Ulum Gulaothi, where he studied with Majid Ali Jaunpuri and then went to Delhi with him and studied books of rational sciences in the madrassas of Delhi. In 1908, he entered the Darul Uloom Deoband and studied Daura Hadith (the final class) in two years instead of one, as per the instructions of Mahmud Hasan Deobandi.

Ahmad began teaching at the Darul Uloom Deoband and later went to the Madrasa Shahi in Shawwal 1339 AH, where he served for 48 years. He was the principal of the Madrasa Shahi and taught Sahih al-Bukhari and Sunan Abu Dawood there. 1161 students studied Sahih al-Bukhari from him between 1377 and 1383 AH. He was appointed the senior hadith professor (Shaykh al-Hadith) at the Darul Uloom Deoband following the death of Hussain Ahmed Madani in 1957. His students included Abdul Ghani Azhari.

During the presidency of Hussain Ahmad Madani, Ahmad twice served as the vice-president of Jamiat Ulama-e-Hind. He became its president following the death of Ahmad Saeed Dehlavi in December 1959.

Aged 82 or 83, Ahmad died on 5 April 1972 (20 Safar 1392 AH). His funeral prayer was led by Muhammad Tayyib Qasmi at Moradabad.

Literary works
Works of Ahmad include:
 Al-Qaul al-Faseeh
 Aameen Bil Jehr Sahih Bukhari Ke Pesh Karda Dala’il Ki Roshni Main
Izaahul Bukhari

References

1889 births
1972 deaths
Deobandis
Indian Sunni Muslim scholars of Islam
People from British India
Darul Uloom Deoband alumni
Academic staff of Darul Uloom Deoband
Students of Mahmud Hasan Deobandi
Presidents of Jamiat Ulama-e-Hind